, derived from the second kanji from  and the first kanji from  (but in on-reading instead of kun-reading), refers generally to Osaka, Kobe, and the surrounding area in the Kansai region of Japan. 

In the context of a region of Hyōgo Prefecture, the term is used to refer to the 8 small municipalities (Amagasaki, Ashiya, Inagawa, Itami, Kawanishi, Nishinomiya, Sanda and Takarazuka) located close to the northern coast of Osaka Bay between the two large cities of Kobe and Osaka. In some contexts, the eastern Higashinada and Nada wards of Kobe and Nishiyodagawa Ward of Osaka are also included.

The name Hanshin may also refer to:
 Hanshin Department Store, a chain of department stores based in Osaka
 Hanshin Electric Railway, a railway that links Osaka and Kobe
 Hanshin Main Line, a line operated by the railway
 Hanshin Expressway, a network of tolled highways surrounding Osaka, Kobe, and Kyoto
 Hanshin Industrial Region, the industrial region encompassing Osaka and Kobe metropolitan areas
 Hanshin Racecourse, a horse racetrack in Takarazuka, Hyogo
 Hanshin Tigers, a professional baseball team in Nishinomiya, Hyogo
 Hanshin: Half-God, manga by Moto Hagio

See also
Great Hanshin earthquake, 1995 earthquake centered in southern Hyogo
Hanshin Education Incident, 1948 incident in which Korean ethnic schools in Japan were closed down
Keihanshin, a macro-region including Kyōto (Kei-) and Hanshin
Hanshinkan Modernism, the cultural and arts movement in the region during the early 20th century

Hyōgo Prefecture
Kobe
Osaka Prefecture